Betsy and the Great World (1952) is the ninth volume in the Betsy-Tacy series of children's fiction by Maud Hart Lovelace. The book, along with the entire Betsy-Tacy and Deep Valley series, was republished in 2000 by HarperTrophy with a new cover art illustrated by Michael Koelsch.

The novel is set in 1914 and focuses on the newly adult Betsy Ray's adventures while spending a year traveling through Europe in place of attending college.  The novel is based on the journals of the author's own trip to Europe during 1914.  The novel discusses the buildup of troops in Germany prior to World War I, and also includes an account of England's declaration of war.

Places visited by Betsy Ray in the novel
The Azores (boat excursion)
Madeira (boat excursion)
Gibraltar (boat excursion)
Algiers (boat excursion)
Genoa (briefly: goes ashore and hops on train)
Munich (extended stay)
Sonneberg
Bayreuth
Oberammergau
Venice (extended stay)
Lucerne
Paris
London (extended stay)

References

Betsy-Tacy
1952 American novels
Fiction set in 1914
Novels set during World War I
Novels set in Europe
Children's historical novels
1952 children's books
Thomas Y. Crowell Co. books